Porrorhachis is a genus of flowering plants from the orchid family, Orchidaceae. It contains two known species, both native to Southeast Asia.

Porrorhachis galbina (J.J.Sm.) Garay - Sabah, Sulawesi, Java
Porrorhachis macrosepala (Schltr.) Garay - Sulawesi

See also 
 List of Orchidaceae genera

References

External links 

Orchids of Asia
Vandeae genera
Aeridinae